Novyi Svit is an urban-type settlement in Starobesheve Raion (district) in Donetsk Oblast of eastern Ukraine. Population:

Demographics
Native language as of the Ukrainian Census of 2001:
 Ukrainian 11.43%
 Russian 88.31%
 Greek 0.07%
 Belarusian 0.05%
 Armenian 0.01%

References

Urban-type settlements in Kalmiuske Raion